Annette Trimbee is a Canadian civil servant who is the sixth president and vice-chancellor of MacEwan University. Prior to her appointment, she was the seventh president and vice-chancellor of the University of Winnipeg and spent several years as a deputy minister in the Government of Alberta.

References

External links 
 Biography from the University of Winnipeg

Presidents of the University of Winnipeg
Canadian women civil servants
Living people
People from Winnipeg
Canadian academic administrators
Women heads of universities and colleges
Year of birth missing (living people)